Trichonyx is a genus of ant-loving beetles in the family Staphylinidae. There are at least two described species in Trichonyx.

Species
These two species belong to the genus Trichonyx:
 Trichonyx antennatus Raffray, 1877
 Trichonyx sulcicollis (Reichenbach, 1816)

References

Further reading

External links

 

Pselaphinae
Articles created by Qbugbot